Harry Potter in Calcutta is a work by Uttam Ghosh in which Harry Potter meets figures from Bengali literature. J. K. Rowling and her lawyers sued for the novel to be removed from the market, citing intellectual property concerns, and subsequently it was withdrawn from sale.

See also
Legal disputes over the Harry Potter series#International publications

References

2003 Indian novels
Works based on Harry Potter
Novels set in Kolkata